Yassine Salhi may refer to:
Yassin Salhi (1980-2015), French domestic terrorist
Yassine Salhi (footballer, born 1987), Moroccan football forward
Yassine Salhi (footballer, born 1989), Tunisian football midfielder

See also
Yassine Sahli (born 1987), Tunisian football defender